"11:11"  is a song recorded by South Korean singer Taeyeon. It was released as a digital single on November 1, 2016, by SM Entertainment. The song's lyrics were penned by Kim Eana while its music was composed by Christian Vinten and Chelcee Grimes. The song was later included in the Deluxe edition of Taeyeon's first studio album My Voice which was released on April 5, 2017.

Background and release 
On October 28, 2016, Taeyeon was announced to be releasing a digital single titled "11:11". The song is described as a pop ballad that features the acoustic guitar's calm melody which suits the late autumn atmosphere. Its lyrics are about a girl's reminiscences about making wishes with her former lover when the clock struck 11:11.

"11:11" and its music video were released on November 1. Taeyeon later filmed a live acoustic performance of the song, which was released on November 8.

Reception
"11:11" debuted at number two on South Korea's Gaon Digital Chart for the chart issue dated October 30 – November 5, 2016, and sold 238,197 downloads during its first week of release. It was the second best-performing single of November 2016 on the Gaon Digital Chart, ranking behind Twice's "TT". "11:11" charted at number 89 on the Gaon Year-end Digital Chart of 2016, and sold 668,462 downloads in South Korea in 2016. It additionally peaked at number 5 on the Billboard World Digital Songs chart, selling 3,000 downloads, becoming her best sales week on the chart.

Billboard ranked the song at number 7 on their top 20 K-pop songs of 2016. By the end of 2017, "11:11" sold over 1.4 million digital copies in South Korea.

Track listing

Credits 
Credits adapted from the liner notes of My Voice (Deluxe edition)

 Korean lyrics by Kim Eana
 Composed and arranged by Christian Vinten, Chelcee Grimes
 Background vocals by Taeyeon
 Vocal directed by Lee Ju-hyung
 Digital editing by Jang Woo-young at Doobdoob Studio
 Pro Tools operating by Lee Ju-hyung
 Recorded and mixed by Kim Cheol-sun at S.M. Blue Ocean Studio
 Mastered by Tom Coyne at Sterling Sound

Charts

Weekly charts

Monthly chart

Year-end chart

Sales

Accolades

Release history

References

External links 
 

2016 singles
2016 songs
SM Entertainment singles
Korean-language songs
Songs with lyrics by Kim Eana
Taeyeon songs
Songs written by Chelcee Grimes